LSPI may refer to:
 Low-Speed Pre-Ignition, a pre-ignition event that occurs in gasoline vehicle engines
 LiquidPower Specialty Products Inc., a Berkshire Hathaway company